Ansar ul Islam was founded in 2004 by Pir Saif-ur Rehman, a Sufi-influenced Sunni Barelvi Afghan. They are a militant Islamist group in North-west Pakistan and are rivals of Lashkar-e-Islam. The group was banned by the Pakistani government in June 2008.

The group is currently led by Qazi Mehboob-ul-Haq.

Foreign Relations

Designation as a terrorist organization
Countries and organizations below have officially listed the Ansar ul-Islam is a terrorist organization.

References

Islamic organisations based in Pakistan
2006 establishments in Pakistan
Paramilitary organisations based in Pakistan
Organisations designated as terrorist by Pakistan